Akhtar Hussain (date of birth unknown, died 24 August 1973) was a Pakistani cricket umpire. He stood in three Test matches between 1959 and 1968.

See also
 List of Test cricket umpires

References

Year of birth missing
1946 deaths
Place of birth missing
Pakistani Test cricket umpires